Directorate of Medical Education is an administrative body of Andhra Pradesh State, India. It overlooks the Medical Education in Andhra Pradesh through Medical Colleges. It is located at Koti, Hyderabad

It is headed by Director of Medical Education who oversees the functioning of Principals of Medical and Nursing Colleges, Superintendents of General and Speciality Hospitals and Chief Accounts Officers. He is assisted by Additional Director, Joint Directors and Assistant Directors and Chief Information Officer.

There are 33 medical colleges, 13 dental colleges and about 100 paramedical centers functions under the directorate.

External links
 Official website of Directorate of Medical Education, Andhra Pradesh.

State agencies of Andhra Pradesh
Medical education in India
Education in Hyderabad, India
Organisations based in Hyderabad, India
Year of establishment missing